Shikha may refer to:

Sikha, a traditional Hindu hair style
Shikha, Nepal
Shikha (actress), South Indian film actress
Shikha Joshi, Indian actress
Shikha Makan, Indian ad-film director, filmmaker and screenwriter.
Shikha (journal), an early 20th literary publication from Dhaka